Azganin may refer to:

Azganin-e Olya
Azganin-e Sofla